Bashō is a crater on Mercury named after Matsuo Bashō, a 17th-century Japanese writer. Bashō crater is only  in diameter, but is a prominent feature on Mercury's surface, due to its bright rays. Photographs from NASA's Mariner 10 and MESSENGER spacecraft show a curious halo of dark material around the crater.

Bashō is one of the largest craters of the Kuiperian system on Mercury. The largest is Bartók crater.

References 

Impact craters on Mercury